Hristu Cândroveanu (5 February 1928 – 9 December 2013) was a Romanian editor, literary critic, poet, prose writer and translator of Aromanian ethnicity. He published several works related to the Aromanians, led several Aromanian magazines and was involved in some Aromanian organizations.

Biography
He graduated from the Faculty of Philology at the University of Bucharest on 1952. Following this, he became a Romanian-language teacher for several years in localities of the modern Călărași and Prahova counties as well as in the city of Ploiești.

In 1973, he began his career as a writer with his volume Poeme. Throughout the years, Cândroveanu would publish a multitude of works related to the Aromanians, an ethnic group to which he belonged. During the 80s, he was a literary critic and editor at the magazine Tomis, prestigious in Romanian Dobruja. He also became editor-in-chief of the newspaper Livres roumains ("Romanian Books"), created and directed the Aromanian magazines Deșteptarea ("The Awakening") and Dimândarea ("The Will"), founded in 1992 the Dimândarea Părintească Aromanian Cultural Foundation and also became president of the Macedo-Romanian Cultural Society. Cândroveanu held the stance that the Aromanians were not an ethnic group of their own, but part of the Romanians.

Cândroveanu died on 9 December 2013.

See also
 Aromanians in Romania

References

1928 births
2013 deaths
Romanian people of Aromanian descent
Aromanian editors
Romanian magazine editors
Romanian newspaper editors
Aromanian literary critics
Romanian literary critics
Aromanian poets
Romanian male poets
Aromanian schoolteachers
Romanian schoolteachers
Aromanian translators
Romanian translators
Aromanian writers
20th-century Romanian male writers
21st-century Romanian male writers
Pro-Romanian Aromanians
Members of the Macedo-Romanian Cultural Society
University of Bucharest alumni